Major-General Sir Percival Otway Hambro  (10 December 1870 – 25 November 1931) was a British Army officer.

Military career

Educated at Eton College, Hambro was commissioned into the 4th Battalion, the Cameronians (Scottish Rifles) before transferring to the 15th The King's Hussars on 18 June 1892. After serving in the Second Boer War, he saw action as Quarter-Master General for the 3rd Division on the Western Front during First World War for which he was appointed a Companion of the Order of St Michael and St George. After the war he took charge of logistics in Baghdad. He became Major-General, Administration at Aldershot Command in November 1925 and General Officer Commanding the 46th (North Midland) Division in May 1927 before retiring in May 1931.

References

1870 births
1931 deaths
British Army major generals
Knights Commander of the Order of the British Empire
Companions of the Order of the Bath
Companions of the Order of St Michael and St George
Cameronians officers
15th The King's Hussars officers
People educated at Eton College
Hambro family
People from Andover, Hampshire
Military personnel from Hampshire
British Army cavalry generals of World War I
British Army personnel of the Second Boer War